The Malaysia women's national field hockey team represents Malaysia in international field hockey competitions. As of Jan 2017, the team was ranked 21st in the FIH World Rankings. The team is part of the Asian Hockey Federation. They recently participated in the inaugural International Super Series in Perth, playing against India and Australia in a modified 9-a-side format.

Malaysia achieved 5th place in the 2007 Women's Hockey Asia Cup. The team won a bronze medal in the 1982 Asian Games and came 4th place in 1986.

History
In 2010, the women's national team is invited to play in Malaysia Junior Hockey League as preparation match before the World Cup qualifier.

The following season, the women's national team joined with Bandar Penawar Sports School to enter as a team in Division 2 of MHJL.

The women's national hockey team create world record with 36–0 thrashing over Cambodia during a group match in 2013 Southeast Asian Games, Yangon. It is a new world record for the highest score in an international match, last held by Argentina after they defeated Peru 26–0 at the South American Women's Championships in Santiago, Chile, in 2003.

Tournament records

Junior team

References

External links
Official website
FIH profile

Field hockey
National team
Asian women's national field hockey teams